Saskatoon/Richter Field Aerodrome  is located  north of Saskatoon and just west of Martensville, Saskatchewan, Canada.

See also 
 List of airports in Saskatchewan

References 

Registered aerodromes in Saskatchewan
Corman Park No. 344, Saskatchewan
Martensville